Kabakov (Russian or Bulgarian: Кабаков) is a Russian masculine surname originating from the word kabak meaning tavern; its feminine counterpart is Kabakova. It may refer to
Georgi Kabakov (born 1986), Bulgarian international football referee
Ilya Kabakov (born 1933), Russian-American conceptual artist
Larisa Kabakova (born 1953), Soviet sprint canoer

Russian-language surnames